Sharekh (also Romanized as Shārekh) is a village in Jahanabad Rural District, in the Central District of Hirmand County, Sistan and Baluchestan Province, Iran. At the 2006 census, its population was 55, in 13 families.

References 

Populated places in Hirmand County